The meridian 85° west of Greenwich is a line of longitude that extends from the North Pole across the Arctic Ocean, North America, the Gulf of Mexico, the Caribbean Sea, Central America, the Pacific Ocean, the Southern Ocean, and Antarctica to the South Pole.

The 85th meridian west forms a great circle with the 95th meridian east.

From Pole to Pole
Starting at the North Pole and heading south to the South Pole, the 85th meridian west passes through:

{| class="wikitable plainrowheaders"
! scope="col" width="120" | Co-ordinates
! scope="col" | Country, territory or sea
! scope="col" | Notes
|-
| style="background:#b0e0e6;" | 
! scope="row" style="background:#b0e0e6;" | Arctic Ocean
| style="background:#b0e0e6;" |
|-
| 
! scope="row" | 
| Nunavut — Ellesmere Island and Axel Heiberg Island
|-
| style="background:#b0e0e6;" | 
! scope="row" style="background:#b0e0e6;" | Eureka Sound
| style="background:#b0e0e6;" |
|-valign="top"
| 
! scope="row" | 
| Nunavut — Ellesmere Island, Hoved Island and Ellesmere Island again
|-
| style="background:#b0e0e6;" | 
! scope="row" style="background:#b0e0e6;" | Jones Sound
| style="background:#b0e0e6;" |
|-
| 
! scope="row" | 
| Nunavut — Devon Island
|-
| style="background:#b0e0e6;" | 
! scope="row" style="background:#b0e0e6;" | Parry Channel
| style="background:#b0e0e6;" |
|-
| 
! scope="row" | 
| Nunavut — Baffin Island
|-
| style="background:#b0e0e6;" | 
! scope="row" style="background:#b0e0e6;" | Admiralty Inlet
| style="background:#b0e0e6;" |
|-
| 
! scope="row" | 
| Nunavut — Baffin Island
|-
| style="background:#b0e0e6;" | 
! scope="row" style="background:#b0e0e6;" | Fury and Hecla Strait
| style="background:#b0e0e6;" |
|-valign="top"
| 
! scope="row" | 
| Nunavut — Melville Peninsula (mainland), White Island and Southampton Island
|-
| style="background:#b0e0e6;" | 
! scope="row" style="background:#b0e0e6;" | Hudson Bay
| style="background:#b0e0e6;" |
|-
| 
! scope="row" | 
|Northern Ontario
|-
| style="background:#b0e0e6;" | 
! scope="row" style="background:#b0e0e6;" | Lake Superior
| style="background:#b0e0e6;" |
|-
| 
! scope="row" | 
| Michigan
|-
| style="background:#b0e0e6;" | 
! scope="row" style="background:#b0e0e6;" | Lake Michigan
| style="background:#b0e0e6;" |
|-valign="top"
| 
! scope="row" | 
|-valign="top"
| style="background:#b0e0e6;" | 
! scope="row" style="background:#b0e0e6;" | Gulf of Mexico
|-
| style="background:#b0e0e6;" | 
! scope="row" style="background:#b0e0e6;" | Caribbean Sea
| style="background:#b0e0e6;" |
|-
| 
! scope="row" | 
|
|-
| 
! scope="row" | 
| Passing through Lake Nicaragua
|-
| 
! scope="row" | 
|
|-
| style="background:#b0e0e6;" | 
! scope="row" style="background:#b0e0e6;" | Pacific Ocean
| style="background:#b0e0e6;" |
|-
| style="background:#b0e0e6;" | 
! scope="row" style="background:#b0e0e6;" | Southern Ocean
| style="background:#b0e0e6;" |
|-
| 
! scope="row" | Antarctica
|-
|}

See also
84th meridian west
86th meridian west

w085 meridian west